A by-election was held in the Tongan electorate of Tongatapu 8 on 19 January 2023. The by-election was triggered by the death of Semisi Fakahau on 27 October 2022. The election was won by Johnny Taione.

In January 2023 the Democratic Party of the Friendly Islands announced Sosefo Ngavis Hehea as its candidate. Three other candidates contested the by-election: Johnny Taione, Viliami Sisifā, and Sipaisi Kutu.

Johnny Taione won the seat.

References

By-election
By-elections to the Legislative Assembly of Tonga
Tonga
Tongatapu